Thalwil railway station is a railway station in the municipality of Thalwil in the Swiss Canton of Zürich. The station is located on the Lake Zurich left bank (Zurich to Chur) main line and the Thalwil–Arth-Goldau railway, part of the Zurich to Lucerne line. To the Zurich side of the station, the Zimmerberg Base Tunnel diverges from the original lakeside line, whilst on the Lucerne side is the junction point where the Zurich to Chur and Zurich to Lucerne lines diverge. Thus all trains on both lines must pass through the station.

The station is served on the lakeside line by an hourly long-distance RegioExpress service between Zürich and Chur. The station is also served by trains on lines S2, S8, and S24 of the Zürich S-Bahn.

Services 
 the following services stop at Thalwil:

 InterRegio:
 Zürich S-Bahn:

Gallery

References

External links 
 
 

Railway stations in the canton of Zürich
Swiss Federal Railways stations
Thalwil